Mount Susini is a mountain rising to 370 m at the northwest end of Mackenzie Peninsula, Laurie Island, in the South Orkney Islands. Named "Monte Susini" by an Argentine Antarctic Expedition, 1957. An English form of the name has been approved.

Laurie Island
Susini